Jean-Manuel Thetis (born 5 November 1971 in Sarcelles, France) is a French former professional footballer who played 116 matches and scored 4 goals in Ligue 1 in the 1989–1997 period and played 22 matches and scored 2 goals for Marseille in Ligue 2 in the 1994–95 season. Thetis then went on to have a 3-year spell at Ipswich Town. At Ipswich he scored important winners in two 1–0 league victories against Tranmere Rovers and West Bromwich Albion (a game in which he later got sent off). He also scored once for Ipswich in the League Cup against Luton Town. He then had a brief loan spell at Wolverhampton Wanderers in 2000, before joining Sheffield United in January 2001.

Honours
Ipswich Town
Football League First Division play-offs: 2000

References

External links

French footballers
1971 births
Living people
Association football defenders
Montpellier HSC players
Olympique de Marseille players
Ipswich Town F.C. players
Wolverhampton Wanderers F.C. players
Sheffield United F.C. players
Sevilla FC players